Chengdu No.7 High School is located at Moziqiao (Linyin Campus) and Chengdu High-tech Zone (Gaoxin Campus), Chengdu. Chengdu No.7 High School was established in 1905 and was formerly known as Chengdu County Middle School before 1952. It is one of the first key high schools designated by Ministry of Education of China. Considered to be the top high school in Sichuan Province and Western China, Chengdu No.7 High school is well known across China for its high-quality education and excellent academic performance in science and mathematics. It is one of the four "National Model High schools" in China. Most of the students in Chengdu No.7 High School are admitted in the top universities in China and prestigious universities in the world every year.

History
A brief history of the school follows:

Mochi Academy (Mochi Shuyuan) was founded in the era of Song Dynasty of China.

In 1852, Mochi Academy was split into two academies, Mochi Academy and Furong Academy (Furong Shuyuan).

In 1905, Mochi Academy and Furong Academy merged and established Chengdu County Advanced Elementary School, a four-year school.

In 1906, Chengdu County Middle School (four-year junior middle school)

In 1924, Chengdu County Middle School (three-year junior middle school)

In 1931, Chengdu County High School, three-year senior middle class was established.

In 1950, Chengdu County Middle School incorporated with Chengdu County Female High School (established in 1930).

In 1952, Chengdu County Middle School renamed as Chengdu No.7 High School.

In 2014, Chengdu No.7 High School added sign "Chengdu High School".

Academic achievement
The achievement of students in the National College Entrance Examinations and Middle School Entrance Examinations have been the best in Chengdu City and Sichuan Province for several decades. The college admission rate of the school's senior class has remained at roughly 99% or above. About 80% of the graduates enroll in key universities in the nation for higher education.

The number of students who have won prizes in various contests held by the State and Sichuan Province remains high at around 400 each year. In the past five years, 32 students have participated in the finals of National Contests in mathematics, physics, chemistry, and computing. Seven students have joined the national Olympic training teams in different disciplines. Among them, Zhang Yin and Wang Xiaochuan have won the gold medals in the 37th International Math and the 8th International Information Science Olympic Contests, respectively. Yang Jun won the championship of the American National Math Contest in 1992.

Most students in Chengdu No.7 High School become the students in top universities in China and in the world every year.

The Wind Orchestra
Chengdu No.7 High School Wind Orchestra is the biggest and most historic (established in 1988) one in Sichuan, and it has gained a lot of honors. The orchestra plays an important role in the history of Chengdu no.7 high school. It was chosen to represent the school's music level, so its members have to be more intelligent and flexible than other teenage amateur music players.

In the year of 1989, the orchestra held a performance to commemorate Nie Er (composer of the PRC's National Anthem) in Kunming, which was its first display out of Sichuan. It was a huge success, then the orchestra went out once or more annually to give concerts or displays. With its fame increasing, the orchestra was invited to Australia in 2004. The orchestra left an excellent impression on Sydney's medias. This successful event represented the musical level of all Sichuan's middle school students. 2 years later, in July 2004, the band went to Vienna to join the 2004 World Cup for Band. Here they received a bronze cup. Then, the orchestra went to Singapore in 2010 to participate International music competition, and it won the silver prize. And in July 2011, the orchestra went to Switzerland to celebrate the music festival held in Jungfrau, and got a silver cup.

Besides those out-province achievements, the orchestra also earned reputation in Sichuan. It joins Sichuan students' musical competition every year and rarely fell into the second rank. Though it stopped activities during the 2003 "SARS" period and the 2009 H1N1 influenza period, it still attends the closing ceremony for artistic festival in CD no.7 high school.

Swimming team
Chengdu No.7 High School has a leading swimming team. Founded in 2004 with only 2 athletes and coached by Mr. Pu Jun(蒲俊), the team now has 22 national-graded athletes, including several level-1 graded athletes. Between 2009 and 2011, the team achieved 3 consecutive winning of Sichuan swimming team championship.

Famous alumni
Chen Jiayong (Simplified Chinese:陈家镛), metallurgist and chemical engineer, Member of China Academy of Sciences
Li Yinyuan (Simplified Chinese:李荫远), physicist, Member of China Academy of Sciences
Tang Mingshu (Simplified Chinese:唐明述), Member of Chinese Academy of Engineering
Zhang Xingdong (Simplified Chinese:张兴栋), biomedical scientist, Member of Chinese Academy of Engineering, Foreign member of National Academy of Engineering, U.S., Chairman of International Union of Societies for Biomaterials Science and Engineering, IUSBSE
Wang Dacheng (Simplified Chinese:王大成), Member of China Academy of Sciences
Sha Guohe (Simplified Chinese:沙国河), chemist, Member of China Academy of Sciences
Pu Fuke (Simplified Chinese:蒲富恪), physicist, Member of China Academy of Sciences
Ye Shangfu,(Simplified Chinese:叶尚福), Member of Chinese Academy of Engineering
Peng Kunchi (Simplified Chinese:彭堃墀), Member of China Academy of Sciences, Former president of Shanxi University
Fei-fei Li (李飞飞), Member of the National Academy of Engineering, the National Academy of Medicine, and the American Academy of Arts and Sciences
Wang Xiaochuan (王小川), Founder & CEO of Sogou Inc. (NYSE: SOGO)
Chen Rui (陈睿), President & CEO of Bilibili Inc. (NASDAQ: BILI, 9626.HK), Founder of Cheetah Mobile (NYSE: CMCM)
Ren Yuxin (任宇昕), CTO of Tencent (0700.HK)
Bao Ta (包塔), Vice President & CTO of Meituan (3690.HK)
Xiong Jian (熊剑), Vice Chairman & COO of BlueFocus Communication Group (300058 CH)
Zhuang Li (庄莉), Founder & CEO of Megatronix, co-founder of NetEase Youdao (NASDAQ: DAO), Former Vice President of Nio (NYSE: NIO)
He Xiaofei (何晓飞), Founder & CEO of Fabu.AI, Former Senior Vice President of DiDi Chuxing (NYSE: DIDI)
Xiaoqiang Zheng (郑晓强), Principal Software Engineer of Facebook (NASDAQ: FB)
David Daokui Li (李稻葵), Economist, Director of the Center for China in the World Economy (CCWE) at Tsinghua University
Wei Zhang (张伟), Recipient of the SASTRA Ramanujan Prize, Fellow of the American Mathematical Society, Professor at MIT 
Xu Rongkai (徐荣凯), Former Governor of Yunnan Province.

Foreign Exchange Program
Chengdu No.7 High School has an exchange program with Jenks Public Schools, IGS Bonn Beuel and Brockenhurst College since 2003.

Campus culture
There are four major student's Organisations in Chengdu No.7 High school: Youth League Committee (共青团委员会), Student union (学生会), Science and technology association (科协) and United clubs association (社联, UCA), which are administrating by students. Besides there're more than 30 other club in the school such as Model United Nations( elected to be the greatest club in Chengdu), Volleyball club, Zhaohua literature Club, New Babel Club, English debating club and EYE cosplay clubs etc. The variety of clubs and students organizations provide students with a more colorful study life and platform to recreate and communicate.

The school' s Model United Nations Association, Future Leaders Club, Robotics Team, Students Orchestra, Volleyball team, and Football team are among the best in western China. Chengdu No.7 High School students have earned numerous awards such as the Vex Robotics World Championship, the National High School Students Leadership Championship, and the Grand Prize at National Financial Literacy Competition, to name a few.

References

C